Deoxyguanosine diphosphate (dGDP) is a nucleoside diphosphate.  It is related to the common nucleic acid guanosine triphosphate (GTP), with the -OH group on the 2' carbon on the nucleotide's pentose removed (hence the deoxy- part of the name), and with one fewer phosphoryl group than GTP.

See also
Cofactor
Guanosine

References

Nucleotides
Pyrophosphates
Purines